Barry Byron Mills (July 7, 1948 – July 8, 2018) was an American convicted criminal and leader of the Aryan Brotherhood (AB) prison gang. Nicknamed “The Baron”, Mills was incarcerated in the California state prison system at a young age, where he rose within the AB organization during the 1970s and 80s.

Biography
Mills, from Windsor, California, was first incarcerated in 1967, and jailed for a year in a county lockup. He entered the California state prison system after an armed robbery in 1969, and was in jail from then on.

He became involved with the AB in San Quentin Prison, where the group originated in 1964. He was convicted of nearly decapitating another inmate, John Marsloff, over a gambling debt at USP Atlanta in 1979.

According to a federal indictment, Mills was involved in the consolidation of the AB power structure in 1980, where he assumed a seat in a three-member "federal commission" for the gang. Along with Tyler Bingham, he expanded the operations of the AB in federal and state prisons, moving the group into narcotics dealing and racketeering.

In 1996, Barry Mills proposed that the Aryan Brotherhood absorb the prison gang known as the Dirty White Boys.

In 1997, Mills and his accomplice, Tyler Bingham, reportedly ordered their members to carry out a race war against a rival prison gang, the D.C. Blacks.

In March 2006, Charles Hartsell, a Las Vegas member, and leader of the Las Vegas section, along with three other leaders of the Aryan Brotherhood, including Bingham, were indicted for numerous crimes, including murder, conspiracy, drug trafficking, and racketeering. Barry Mills and Tyler Bingham were convicted of murder and sent back to United States Penitentiary Administrative Maximum Facility Prison (ADX) in Florence, Colorado, after they were given life sentences without the possibility of parole. Federal prosecutors sought a death sentence for Mills and Bingham, but both were spared after jurors deadlocked on whether they should be executed.

Mills died on July 8, 2018, one day after his 70th birthday.


See also
 Clayton Fountain

References

Further reading

External links
 
Photo of Barry Mills (center) with Tyler Bingham (right), at San Quentin State Prison (1970s)

1948 births
2018 deaths
20th-century American criminals
American bank robbers
American drug traffickers
American neo-Nazis
American people convicted of murder
American prisoners sentenced to life imprisonment
American people who died in prison custody
Aryan Brotherhood
Gang members
Inmates of ADX Florence
People convicted of murder by the United States federal government
People from Windsor, California
Prisoners sentenced to life imprisonment by the United States federal government
Prisoners who died in United States federal government detention